USS Psyche V (SP-9) was an armed motorboat that served in the United States Navy as a patrol vessel from 1917 to 1919.

Psyche V was built in 1911 by Fred S. Nock at East Greenwich, Rhode Island, as the private wooden motorboat Achelous. She had been renamed Psyche V by the time the U.S. Navy purchased her from her owner, W. S. Bentham of New York City, on 23 April 1917 for World War I service. She was delivered to the Navy on 2 May 1917 and commissioned as USS Psyche V (SP-9) at New York on 15 June 1917.

Psyche V was assigned to Squadron 8 in the 3rd Naval District for section patrol in the vicinity of New York City. She was transferred to Squadron 19 based at New York on 19 December 1918.

Psyche V was transferred to the United States Department of Commerce on 16 June 1919.

Notes

References

Department of the Navy: Naval Historical Center: Online Library of Selected Images: U.S. Navy Ships: USS Psyche V (SP-9), 1917-1919. Previously a civilian motor boat named Psyche V and Achelous.
NavSource Online: Section Patrol Craft Photo Archive Psyche V (SP 9)

Patrol vessels of the United States Navy
World War I patrol vessels of the United States
Ships built in East Greenwich, Rhode Island
1911 ships
East Greenwich, Rhode Island